Pagan the Butler (died around 1149) was lord of Oultrejordain in the Kingdom of Jerusalem from around 1126. He was first mentioned as the butler of Baldwin II of Jerusalem in 1120. He ordered the erection of Kerak Castle which became his seat in 1142.

Career

Pagan was an influential retainer of Baldwin II of Jerusalem who mounted the throne in 1118. Baldwin soon reorganized the royal court and appointed his faithful supporters to the highest offices. Pagan was first mentioned as the king's butler in 1120. Hans Eberhard Mayer argues that Pagan the Butler (who was mentioned in 1120) and Pagan of Montreal (mentioned in 1126) were not identical, but other historians have not accepted Mayer's view. Pagan replaced Roman of Le Puy as lord of Oultrejordain by 1126. According to a royal charter which was issued in 1161, Pagan was the first lord of Oultrejordain, which implies that Le Puy had not ruled the whole territory of the lordship.

Initially, Pagan had his seat in the castle of Montréal. After he could not prevent a band of Syrian soldiers from making a raid across the Jordan River, he decided to build a new fortress at a triangular plateau at the Wadi al-Karak which was located closer to the Dead Sea and Jerusalem. He transferred his seat to the newly built Kerak Castle in 1142. Pagan died in the late 1140s. He was succeeded by his nephew Maurice.

References

Sources 

 
 
 
 
 
 

1140s deaths
Christians of the Crusades
Pagan
Year of birth unknown